Marcela Alejandra Ríos Tobar (born 14 December 1966) is a Chilean politician and sociologist who served as Chile's Minister of Justice from March 2022 to January 2023.

References

External links
 

1966 births
Living people
21st-century Chilean politicians
Chilean Ministers of Justice
Female justice ministers
Social Convergence politicians
Alumni of the University of York
University of Wisconsin–Madison alumni
Women government ministers of Chile
Politicians from Santiago